Palio pallida is a species of sea slug, a nudibranch, a shell-less marine gastropod mollusc in the family Polyceridae.

Distribution 
This species was described from Kyska Harbour, Aleutian Islands, North Pacific Ocean. It has not been reported since the original description and may be identical with Palio amakusana or Palio dubia.

References

Polyceridae
Gastropods described in 1880